Udey Chand (born 25 June 1935) is a retired Indian wrestler and wrestling coach who was the first individual world championship medal winner from independent India.

He was awarded the first Arjuna Award in wrestling in 1961, by Government of India.

Early life
Chand was born on 25 June 1935 in Jandli village of Hisar district and currently resides in Hisar.

Career
He started his career with the Indian Army. He created history by winning a bronze medal in Light Weight (67 kg) Freestyle at 1961 World Wrestling Championships at Yokohama. During his bout against the eventual world champion Mahamed-Ali Sanatkaran he was particularly unlucky as referees judged his throwing down of the opponent outside the area and the bout ended in a 1–1 draw. For his achievements he was conferred the first Arjuna Award in wrestling in 1961 by President of India,.

He participated in three Olympic Games namely Rome 1960, Tokyo 1964, Mexico City 1968 and finished with a creditable 6th Rank in Mexico City.

He took part twice in Asian Games winning two silver medals in 70 kg Freestyle as well as 70 kg Greco-Roman at 1962 Asian Games Jakarta and won a bronze medal in 70 kg Freestyle at 1966 Asian Games Bangkok. In addition to these he participated in four different world wrestling championships i.e. Yokohama 1961, Manchester 1965, Delhi 1967 and Edmonton 1970. He signed off his glittering career with a befitting gold medal at 1970 British Commonwealth Games held at Edinburgh, Scotland.

He remained an undisputed national champion in India from 1958 to 1970.

Later life
After retiring from Indian Army he joined Chaudhary Charan Singh Haryana Agricultural University, Hisar as a coach and rendered his services from 1970 to 1996. During his time as coach he groomed many international level wrestlers and guided the university team to many All Indian Inter University Championship triumphs.

Currently he lives in Hisar and still actively assists budding wrestlers.

References

External links
 

1935 births
Living people
People from Hisar district
Indian wrestling coaches
Olympic wrestlers of India
Wrestlers at the 1960 Summer Olympics
Wrestlers at the 1964 Summer Olympics
Wrestlers at the 1968 Summer Olympics
Indian male sport wrestlers
Wrestlers at the 1970 British Commonwealth Games
Indian Army personnel
Sport wrestlers from Haryana
Commonwealth Games gold medallists for India
Recipients of the Arjuna Award
Asian Games medalists in wrestling
Wrestlers at the 1962 Asian Games
Wrestlers at the 1966 Asian Games
World Wrestling Championships medalists
Asian Games silver medalists for India
Asian Games bronze medalists for India
Commonwealth Games medallists in wrestling
Medalists at the 1962 Asian Games
Medalists at the 1966 Asian Games
Medallists at the 1970 British Commonwealth Games